Keflavík Airport , also known as Reykjavík–Keflavík Airport, is the largest airport in Iceland and the country's main hub for international transportation. Most international journeys to or from Iceland pass through this airport.

The main carrier at Keflavík is Icelandair, which has the airport as its main hub. Keflavík Airport is operated by Isavia, a government enterprise.

History

Early years
Originally, the airport was built by the United States military during World War II, as a replacement for a small British landing strip at Garður to the north. It consisted of two separate two-runway airfields, built simultaneously just 4 km apart. Patterson Field in the south-east opened in 1942 despite being partly incomplete. It was named after a young pilot who died in Iceland. Meeks Field to the north-west opened on 23 March 1943. It was named after another young pilot, George Meeks, who died on the Reykjavík airfield. Patterson Field was closed after the war, but Meeks Field and the adjoining structures were returned to Iceland's control and were renamed Naval Air Station Keflavik, for the nearby town of Keflavík. In 1951, the U.S. military returned to the airport under a defence agreement between Iceland and the U.S. signed on 5 May 1951.

Development since the 1950s
With the reestablishment of the military air base at Keflavík during the 1950s, the air terminal found itself in the middle of a secure military zone. Travelers had to pass through military check points to reach their flights, until 1987, when the civilian terminal was relocated.

The presence of foreign military forces in Iceland under the NATO-sponsored Iceland–U.S. Defense Agreement of 1951 was controversial in Iceland, which had no indigenous military forces other than the Icelandic Coast Guard. During the 1960s and 1970s, rallies were held to protest the U.S. military presence in Iceland (and in particular at Keflavík), and every year protesters walked the  road from Reykjavík to Keflavík and chanted "Ísland úr NATO, herinn burt" (literally: Iceland out of NATO, the military away). The protests were not effective.

The two  and  runways were large enough to support NASA's Space Shuttle as well as the Antonov An-225. On 29 June 1999, Concorde G-BOAA flew from Heathrow Airport to Reykjavík (Keflavik airport). The Concorde had been there earlier. The airport is also an important emergency landing runway for large aircraft in transatlantic operation in the ETOPS system, which requires aircraft to always have less than a certain flight time from a suitable landing site. The United States military base closed down in 2006.

The airport was used as a hub by WOW air until it ceased operations on 28 March 2019.

Facilities
The terminal is named after Leif Erikson who was the first European to arrive in North America ("Leif Erikson Air Terminal"). It was opened in April 1987 and separated the airport's civil traffic from the military base. It was later extended with the opening of the South Building in 2001 (not a separate terminal) to comply with the requirements of the Schengen Agreement. The North Building was later enlarged and finished in 2007. The terminal has duty-free stores in the departure and arrival lounges. In 2016, the current terminal was expanded. The expansion added 7 gates. There are also plans to add a third runway.

Airlines and destinations

Passenger
Although the population of Iceland is only about 370,000, there are scheduled flights to and from numerous locations across North America and Europe. The largest carrier operating out of Keflavik is Icelandair. WOW air was the second largest Icelandic carrier and the second largest at Keflavík, following its acquisition of Iceland Express on 23 October 2012, until it ceased operations on 28 March 2019. The airport only handles international flights; domestic flights are operated from Reykjavík's domestic airport.

The following airlines operate regular scheduled and charter services to and from Keflavík:

Cargo

Statistics

Passenger numbers

Busiest destinations

Access
Transport between the airport and downtown Reykjavik is a  journey on Route 41. Buses are operated by Airport Express, Flybus, and Strætó bs to Reykjavík. Taxis are available outside the terminal. Rental cars are available from various companies.

A 49 km long railway, the first in Iceland, is planned to link the airport to Reykjavik in order to relieve one of the country's busiest roads. The railway will accommodate high-speed trains of up to 250 km/h, which will enable the distance to be travelled within just 18 minutes. As of October 2016, construction was to begin in 2020. By 2019, plans were still active but had not come much further than in 2016. , there was little movement even though the most recent estimates had construction starting that same year.

Accidents and incidents
 On 21 July 2013, a Russian Sukhoi Superjet 100 airliner, prototype aircraft 97005, made a belly landing during a test flight. The cause was a crew mistake due to fatigue. They operated the plane manually in order to simulate failures.
 On 28 April 2017, a Primera Air Boeing 737-800 skidded off an icy runway.
On 7 February 2020, an Icelandair Boeing 757-200 suffered a collapsed right main landing gear during touchdown on runway 10.

References

External links

 Official website
 KADECO
 The Icelandic Defence Agency

Airports in Iceland
Airports established in 1942
Reykjanes
1942 establishments in Iceland
Buildings and structures in Keflavík
WOW air
International airports in Iceland